Marco Ferrara (born 5 May 1994) is an Italian footballer who plays as a left back for FC Paradiso. Besides Italy, he has played in the Czech Republic.

Club career
On 26 January 2019, he signed with Cavese. He left the club at the end of the season. On 12 February 2020, Ferrara joined Swiss club FC Paradiso.

References

External links
 

1994 births
Footballers from Milan
Living people
Italian footballers
Italian expatriate footballers
Association football defenders
F.C. Pavia players
Inter Milan players
U.S. Pergolettese 1932 players
FC Locarno players
1. FK Příbram players
Casertana F.C. players
Cavese 1919 players
Serie C players
Czech First League players
Italian expatriate sportspeople in Switzerland
Italian expatriate sportspeople in the Czech Republic
Expatriate footballers in Switzerland
Expatriate footballers in the Czech Republic